Mushimono is a Japanese culinary term referring to a steamed dish, usually containing chicken, fish or vegetables; sometimes treated with sake. The foods are steamed until soft and served hot. Chawanmushi is a popular example.

The steaming methods include:

Steaming the ingredients in small bowls or cups. After steaming, the bowls are served on plates.
Steaming the ingredients loose in a large steamer.

References

Japanese cuisine
Culinary terminology